The Last Boer War is an 1899 non-fiction book by H. Rider Haggard about the Boer War of 1881. It was originally written in 1882 but not published until years later.

References

External links
Complete book at Internet Archive

1899 non-fiction books
Works by H. Rider Haggard
First Boer War